Cities and towns under the oblast's jurisdiction:
Lipetsk (Липецк) (administrative center)
city territorial okrugs:
Levoberezhny (Левобережный)
Oktyabrsky (Октябрьский)
Pravoberezhny (Правобережный)
Sovetsky (Советский)
Yelets (Елец)
Districts:
Chaplyginsky (Чаплыгинский)
Towns under the district's jurisdiction:
Chaplygin (Чаплыгин)
with 22 selsovets under the district's jurisdiction.
Dankovsky (Данковский)
Towns under the district's jurisdiction:
Dankov (Данков)
with 22 selsovets under the district's jurisdiction.
Dobrinsky (Добринский)
with 19 selsovets under the district's jurisdiction.
Dobrovsky (Добровский)
with 17 selsovets under the district's jurisdiction.
Dolgorukovsky (Долгоруковский)
with 14 selsovets under the district's jurisdiction.
Gryazinsky (Грязинский)
Towns under the district's jurisdiction:
Gryazi (Грязи)
with 16 selsovets under the district's jurisdiction.
Izmalkovsky (Измалковский)
with 13 selsovets under the district's jurisdiction.
Khlevensky (Хлевенский)
with 15 selsovets under the district's jurisdiction.
Krasninsky (Краснинский)
with 10 selsovets under the district's jurisdiction.
Lebedyansky (Лебедянский)
Towns under the district's jurisdiction:
Lebedyan (Лебедянь)
with 16 selsovets under the district's jurisdiction.
Lev-Tolstovsky (Лев-Толстовский)
with 12 selsovets under the district's jurisdiction.
Lipetsky (Липецкий)
with 21 selsovets under the district's jurisdiction.
Stanovlyansky (Становлянский)
with 18 selsovets under the district's jurisdiction.
Terbunsky (Тербунский)
with 15 selsovets under the district's jurisdiction.
Usmansky (Усманский)
Towns under the district's jurisdiction:
Usman (Усмань)
with 24 selsovets under the district's jurisdiction.
Volovsky (Воловский)
with 15 selsovets under the district's jurisdiction.
Yeletsky (Елецкий)
with 15 selsovets under the district's jurisdiction.
Zadonsky (Задонский)
Towns under the district's jurisdiction:
Zadonsk (Задонск)
with 17 selsovets under the district's jurisdiction.

References

Lipetsk Oblast
Lipetsk Oblast